Gordonstone is a rural locality in the Central Highlands Region, Queensland, Australia.

Geography 
The locality is bounded by Theresa Creek to the west.

The Gregory Highway enters the locality from the south (Wyuna) and exits to the north (Chirnside). The Central Western railway line enters the locality from the south-west (Fork Lagoons) and exits to the north-west (Hibernia / Chirnside).

Pelican Lagoon is a waterhole in the west of the locality.

The land use is a mix of cropping and grazing on native vegetation.

History 
The name Gordonstone comes from the name of the pastoral run name, named in 1859 by pastoralist Gordon Sandeman using his first name and a reference to the basalt strata underneath the run.

Education 
There are no schools in Gordonstone. The nearest primary schools are Capella State School in Capella to the north and Emerald North State School in Emerald to the south. The nearest secondary schools are Capella State High School in Capella and Emerald State High School in Emerald.

References 

Central Highlands Region
Localities in Queensland